Otto Mueller (December 19, 1875 – January 9, 1973) was an American Republican politician and businessman from Wisconsin.

Career
Born in Wausau, Wisconsin, Mueller was a jeweler in Wausau. He served on the Marathon County, Wisconsin Board of Supervisors. He served in the Wisconsin State Senate 1927-1933 and 1939–1941.

Recall election
In 1932, Mueller survived a recall election.

Notes

Politicians from Wausau, Wisconsin
Businesspeople from Wisconsin
Republican Party Wisconsin state senators
County supervisors in Wisconsin
American jewellers
1875 births
1973 deaths